Jorun Irene Erdal (born 14 May 1963 in Oslo) is a Norwegian singer and musical theatre artist. Her parents are from Oppstryn in Stryn, in Sogn og Fjordane county, and she has also lived there since age 12. She was raised on Snarøya in Bærum, a suburb of the city of Oslo.

Erdal started her musical career touring Norway for three years with the band Ice.  At the end her voice was exhausted, so she decided to take a break studying economics instead. Then she was engaged as a backing vocalists for the two Norwegian revue show stars Hege Schøyen and Øivind Blunck. After seven years, she had done almost 850 performances for them and their two shows Bare gode venner and Fast følge. During the last few years, she has been involved with several summer revues, as well as a couple of Christmas concert tours at winter time. In 1993/1994 she had a hit under the name "Paparazzi Mama" with a dance-pop cover of the song "Mercedes Benz". The song was produced and arranged by Torstein Bieler and David Eriksen.

Since 1999 she has been heavily involved with the Norwegian Eurovision Song Contest selections, the Melodi Grand Prix, participating as a judge in 1999, and competing in 2000, 2005, and 2006.  In 2000 she came fourth with Another You, which she improved in 2005 when her I Am Rock 'n' Roll came second, just short of Wig Wam. In Melodi Grand Prix 2006 she participated with the ABBAish schlager tune Lost and Found, a duet with last year's Eurovision contender for Finland, Geir Rönning.  The duo went straight to the final in Oslo following their performance in the Alta semi-final, and was selected to be performed a second time in the final, ultimately being placed 4th.

Discography

Singles
2006: "Lost and Found" (Jorun Erdal and Geir Rönning)

External links
Official website

1963 births
Living people
Norwegian women singers
Norwegian pop singers
Melodi Grand Prix contestants
Musicians from Oslo
Musicians from Bærum